The 2018 European Korfball A-Championship will be held in the Netherlands from 13 to 21 October 2018. Matches will be played in Drachten, Gorredijk, Heerenveen and Leeuwarden. It will be the first edition where the European Korfball Championship is split into an A-Championship and a B-Championship, with the idea that a certain number of teams will relegate from the A-Championship to the B-Championship after each edition, and a certain number of teams from the B-Championship will be promoted. Whether this will be a direct promotion or relegation, or whether play-offs will need to be played, is yet to be determined.

Qualified teams

Group stage

Group A

|}

Group B

|}

Intermediate stage
Following the group stage, an intermediate round is held, featuring the teams finishing in last place during the group stage and the group winners of the B-Championship. The winners will continue in the A-Championship knockout stage, the losers move to the B-Championship knockout stage. As 10 nations from Europe qualify for the 2019 IKF World Korfball Championship, the winners of these matches qualified for the 2019 IKF World Korfball Championship by virtue of being sure to finish in the top 8. The losing teams might still qualify.

Knockout stage

Final standing
All teams qualify for both the 2019 IKF World Korfball Championship and the 2021 IKF European Korfball A-Championship.

External links
Official website

European Korfball Championship
2018 in korfball
2018 in Dutch sport
International sports competitions hosted by the Netherlands
Korfball in the Netherlands